Trygghamna is a bay in Oscar II Land at Spitsbergen, Svalbard. It is about six kilometer long, located at the northern side of Isfjorden, east of Protektorfjellet, and separated from Ymerbukta by the mountain chain Värmlandryggen. 

Historically, whalers frequently used Trygghamna as a safe harbour.

References

Bays of Spitsbergen